Bajghera is a mid-sized village located in the district of Gurgaon in the state of Haryana in India. It has a population of about 3251 persons living in around 584 households. Bajghera is 8.966 k.m. km far from its mandal main town Gurgaon. Bajghera is located 11.124 km distance from its district main city Gurgaon. Recently HUDA acquired 800 acres of land for setting up 110 A of Gurgaon. This village is near Palam Vihar and Mullahera(sector 22).

Nearby villages are Sarai Alawardi (0.689 km), Daulatabad (2.114 km), Gurgaon (2.620 km), Carterpuri (2.992 km), Sahidpur Mohamad Pur (4.259 km), Babda Vaki Pur (4.259 km) and Dharampur (4.400 km).

See also
 Yaduvanshi Ahirs
 Gurgaon
 Haryana

References 

Villages in Gurgaon district